Maytenus canariensis is a species of plant in the family Celastraceae. It is a conservation dependent tree endemic to the Canary Islands.

References

canariensis
Endemic flora of the Canary Islands
Conservation dependent plants
Near threatened flora of Africa
Taxonomy articles created by Polbot